The Potomac Eagle Scenic Railroad is a heritage railroad based in Romney, West Virginia.

The railroad operates excursion trains over a former Baltimore and Ohio Railroad line that runs between Green Spring and Petersburg. The West Virginia State Rail Authority (SRA) owns the line and freight service is provided by the South Branch Valley Railroad.

The Potomac Eagle Scenic Railroad's excursion trains run from Romney to Moorefield with occasional longer trips to Petersburg. All excursions use diesel locomotives.

A highlight of the trip is passage along the South Branch Potomac River through "The Trough", an area noted for bald eagle sightings.

History
The PESR runs on the track of the South Branch Valley Railroad, which was established by the state of West Virginia in 1978 to operate a line abandoned by the B&O. Freight service on this line operates on weekdays and occasionally on weekends, so the line is free for excursions on most weekends.

In 1989 efforts began to attract an excursion operator, and service began in 1991.

Current Engines, 
The PESR operates a mixture of cars behind four early model diesels:

F7A #722 (ex-Bessemer and Lake Erie), recently repainted into a B&O livery similar to 6604.
FP9A #1755 (ex-Algoma Central).
GP9 #6604 (ex-B&O), one of the distinctive "torpedo boat" units built for passenger service and restored to its original livery
GP9 #6240 (ex C&O) in Chessie System livery
GP9/GP9U  #8250 (ex Canadian Pacific) 

Former Engines 
F3A/F3AU  #8016/#116 (ex Clinchfield Railroad), was painted in the Chesapeake and Ohio Passenger paint Scheme but was Sold to CSX and now operates on CSX's Santa Train and other Northeast United States railroads across the northeast part of the country in a Clinchfield gray livery numbered 800.
FPA4 #6793  (ex Canadian National Railway), was painted in Potomac Eagle Livery along with 722 and 8250. 8250 still has the livery, 722 has a B&O livery and 6793 was sold to the Grand Canyon Railway where it was painted into the Grand Canyon passenger Livery and still works today.
FP7A #118 (ex Clinchfield), kept its CSX scheme before being sold in the early 2000s to the Durbin and Greenbrier Valley Railroad, renumbered to 67, and painted in a Western Maryland Scheme.

See also
List of heritage railroads in the United States
Places on the South Branch Valley Railroad

External links

Potomac Eagle Scenic Railroad website
HawkinsRails' Potomac Eagle scrapbook
 Pic of 6793

Heritage railroads in West Virginia
Tourist attractions in Hampshire County, West Virginia
Tourist attractions in Hardy County, West Virginia
Tourist attractions in Grant County, West Virginia
South Branch Valley Railroad
Transportation in Hampshire County, West Virginia
Transportation in Hardy County, West Virginia
Transportation in Grant County, West Virginia